Josh Shockley (born November 15, 1989) is an American mixed martial artist currently competing in the lightweight division. A professional competitor since 2007, Shockley has also previously competed for the UFC and Bellator.

Mixed martial arts career

Early career
Shockley had first amateur mixed martial arts fight at the age of 16, having falsely told the promotion that he was 18. Shockley won his first six professional bouts and ended the majority of them via stoppage in the first round.

Bellator
Shockley was originally set to make his Bellator debut on March 12, 2011 against Kalvin Hackney at Bellator 36. However, when Toby Imada's opponent refused to weigh in, Shockley was moved up to the main card to face Imada in the quarterfinals of Bellator's season four lightweight tournament. He lost via first-round armbar submission.

Shockley then faced Eric Moon at Bellator 57 on November 12, 2011. Shockley won the bout via guillotine choke submission in the first round.

Shockley fought and defeated UFC veteran Shamar Bailey via unanimous decision at Bellator 60 on March 9, 2012.

In what would be his last fight for the promotion, Shockley fought Keith Schneider at Bellator 70 on May 25, 2012. Shockley lost the fight via armbar submission in the opening minute of round one.

Post-Bellator
Shockley faced Mike Cannon on November 10, 2012 at Hoosier Fight Club 13. Shockley easily defeated Cannon via submission in the first round, resulting in the crowd erupting with laughter as Cannon tapped for what appeared to be his life. Afterwards, Cannon began teaching women's cardio kickboxing in order to improve his performance in the cage, as a way to come back from his embarrassing 1st round loss.

Shockley was expected to face Micah Miller at HFC 15 on April 6, 2013. The bout, however, was cancelled for unknown reasons.

The bout with Micah Miller ended up taking place at Hoosier Fight Club 16 on June 1, 2013. He won the fight via unanimous decision.

Ultimate Fighting Championship
Shockley signed with the UFC in May 2014.

In his UFC debut, Shockley faced Jason Saggo at UFC 174 on June 14, 2014. Shockley lost the fight via TKO in round one.

Shockley was expected to face Fabrício Camões at UFC 179 on October 25, 2014.  However, Shockley pulled out of the bout citing injury and was replaced by Tony Martin.

Shockley faced Ivan Jorge on February 22, 2015 at UFC Fight Night 61. He lost the fight via unanimous decision and was subsequently released from the promotion.

Mixed martial arts record

|-
|Loss
|align=center|11–4
|Ivan Jorge
|Decision (unanimous)
|UFC Fight Night: Bigfoot vs. Mir
|
|align=center|3
|align=center|5:00
|Porto Alegre, Brazil
|
|-
|Loss
|align=center|11–3
|Jason Saggo
|TKO (punches)
|UFC 174
|
|align=center|1
|align=center|4:57
|Vancouver, British Columbia, Canada
|
|-
|Win
|align=center|11–2
|Micah Miller
|Decision (unanimous)
|Hoosier Fight Club 16
|
|align=center|3
|align=center|5:00
|Valparaiso, Indiana, United States
|
|-
|Win
|align=center|10–2
|Mike Cannon
|Submission (rear-naked choke)
|Hoosier Fight Club 13
|
|align=center|1
|align=center|3:23
|Valparaiso, Indiana, United States
|
|-
|Loss
|align=center|9–2
|Keith Schneider
|Submission (armbar)
|Bellator 70
|
|align=center|1
|align=center|0:59
|New Orleans, Louisiana, United States
|
|-
|Win
|align=center|9–1
|Shamar Bailey
|Decision (unanimous)
|Bellator 60
|
|align=center|3
|align=center|5:00
|Hammond, Indiana, United States
|
|-
|Win
|align=center|8–1
|Eric Moon
|Submission (guillotine choke)
|Bellator 57
|
|align=center|1
|align=center|0:35
|Rama, Ontario, Canada
|
|-
|Win
|align=center|7–1
|Mike Santiago
|Submission (rear-naked choke)
|Chicago Cagefighting Championship 4 
|
|align=center|1
|align=center|2:18
|Villa Park, Illinois, United States
|
|-
|Loss
|align=center|6–1
|Toby Imada
|Submission (armbar)
|Bellator 36
|
|align=center|1
|align=center|1:19
|Shreveport, Louisiana, United States
|
|-
|Win
|align=center|6–0
|Jeff Green
|Decision (unanimous)
|Duneland Classic 6
|
|align=center|3
|align=center|5:00
|Crown Point, Indiana, United States
|
|-
|Win
|align=center|5–0
|Vener Galiev
|Submission (armbar)
|fightFORCE: Day of Anger
|
|align=center|1
|align=center|1:15
|St. Petersburg, Russia
|
|-
|Win
|align=center|4–0
|Zachariah Konkle
|TKO (slam)
|C3: Domination
|
|align=center|1
|align=center|0:15
|Hammond, Indiana, United States
|
|-
|Win
|align=center|3–0
|Adam Langwinski
|Submission
|Duneland Classic 5
|
|align=center|1
|align=center|N/A
|Valparaiso, Indiana, United States
|
|-
|Win
|align=center|2–0
|Dylan Sprawl
|TKO (punches)
|Total Fight Challenge 8
|
|align=center|1
|align=center|0:41
|Hammond, Indiana, United States
|
|-
|Win
|align=center|1–0
|Morgan Rapp
|KO (punch)
|Cage Rage: Boot Scootin' Brawl
|
|align=center|1
|align=center|1:28
|Lafayette, Indiana, United States
|

See also
 List of current UFC fighters
 List of male mixed martial artists

References

External links
 
 

Living people
1989 births
American male mixed martial artists
Lightweight mixed martial artists
People from Hobart, Indiana
Mixed martial artists from Indiana
Ultimate Fighting Championship male fighters